Amal may refer to:

 Amal (given name)
 Åmål, a small town in Sweden
 Amal Movement, a Lebanese political party 
 Amal Militia, Amal Movement's defunct militia
 Amal language of Papua New Guinea
 Amal (film), 2007, directed by Richie Mehta
 Amal (carburettor), a UK motorcycle carburetor
 Amal International School, Sri Lanka
 Amal Women's Training Center and Moroccan Restaurant, Marrakesh, Morocco
 Amal dynasty, a Goth dynasty which later became the royal dynasty of the Ostrogoths
 Amal Salam Zgharta FC, a Lebanese football club
 Al Amal orbiter on the Emirates Mars Mission
 Little Amal, a giant puppet

See also 
 Amahl and the Night Visitors, a 1951 opera in one act by Gian Carlo Menotti
 Alamal (disambiguation), for al-Amal, el-Amal, and variation